Haas Automation, Inc is an American machine tool builder headquartered in Oxnard, California. The company designs and manufactures lower cost machine tools and specialized accessory tooling, mostly computer numerically controlled (CNC) equipment, such as vertical machining centers and horizontal machining centers, lathes/turning centers, and rotary tables and indexers. Most of its products are manufactured at the company's main facility in Oxnard. The company is also involved in motorsports: it owns the Haas F1 Team and is a co-owner of Stewart-Haas Racing in NASCAR. 
Haas is one of the largest machine tool builders in the world by total unit volume.

History 

Gene Haas founded Haas Automation in 1983 to manufacture machine tool accessory tooling. The company entered the machine tool industry with the first fully automatic, programmable collet indexer. Over the next four years, the company expanded its product line to include fully programmable rotary tables, rotary indexers, and other machine tool accessories.

In 1987, Haas Automation began developing its first vertical machining center (VMC), the VF-1, a machine designed to perform operations such as milling, drilling, tapping, and boring. The first VF-1 prototypes were completed in 1988, and introduced at the International Manufacturing Technology Show (IMTS '88) in Chicago, Illinois.
 1983: Haas Automation, Inc. established in Sun Valley, CA
 1991: Haas moves to larger facilities in Chatsworth, CA
 2019: Haas purchases  of land in Henderson, Nevada for $27.4 million to expand its business, planning to build 4.3 million square feet of commercial space with 2.3 million square feet intended for a $327 million manufacturing facility

 In March 2023, Haas Automation was accused by the Economic Security Council of Ukraine of violating United States sanctions by supplying the Russian arms industry with CNC machines.

Products 

The company manufactures several lines of CNC machine tools for the metalworking industry.

Vertical Mills

VF Series 
VF series mills are a range of 3-axis vertical machining centers, which can be outfitted with 4th and 5th axis drives if so configured. These mills are available in different sizes, ranging from VF-1 to VF-14.

The VF in the name stands for "Very First" as the first machine Haas produced was the VF-1 ("Very First One"). One of these machines was restored by an employee, gifted to Gene Haas, and now resides in Haas's demo room in Oxnard, CA.

Universal Machines (UMC) 
Haas universal machining centers (known as UMC) are 5-axis bridge-type vertical machines. They were first introduced in 2015.

Mini Mill 
The mini mill was introduced as a small footprint alternative to the VF series mills, featuring a smaller casting while still maintaining a 40 taper spindle.

Toolroom Mills (TM) 
The TM series was first introduced as essentially a "CNC-capable toolroom mill”. Originally, these mills did not feature an enclosure, but have since been outfitted with an enclosure that encompasses the bottom and sides of the machine. These machines are characterized by a smaller casting and slower rapids, as they are targeted towards customers who do not require production capabilities.

Drill/Tap/Mill Series (DT / DM) 
The Haas DT series was originally introduced as a 30 taper high-speed machine, ideal for operations where high speed and small footprint are required, but the ability to handle large axial cutting loads is not needed. Eventually, the DM series was introduced as a 40 taper variant of the DT machine, but does not offer the 20,000 RPM spindle option.

Compact Mill 
The CM is focused on machining small parts where high accuracy is required. The CM is a 20 taper machine, with spindles from 30,000 to 50,000 RPM. Haas only offers one machine in this series, the CM-1.

Gantry Series (GM / GR) 
Gantry Series mills feature a static bed, a bridge that moves along the Y axis, and a head that moves along the X axis. The two primary use cases for GM series machines are large molds. GM series machines feature a more substantial casting with improved chip management as opposed to the GR series. The GM-2-5AX is also available, which is simply a GM-2 featuring two extra axes affixed to the head.

Other Machines 
 VM Series machines feature a grid-style table capable of handling more weight than a comparable VF machine.
 VR Series machines are based on the VF series, but include a special head to allow A and B axis capabilities. VR machines are able to machine larger parts than would be possible on a VF machine outfitted with a 5th axis trunnion, as the head is able to span the entire X and Y axis travel, rather than being constrained by the smaller work envelope of a trunnion.
 VMT (Vertical Mill Turn) series mills feature an HSK-T/A63 spindle and are capable of performing both milling and turning operations.
 The VC-400 machine is a pallet-changing vertical mill, based on the design of the EC-400 horizontal mill with a 90 degree head.

Certifications 
Haas Automation is an ISO 9001 certified company. All machine tools carry the ETL Listed mark, certifying that they conform to the NFPA 79 electrical standard for industrial machinery and the Canadian equivalent, CAN/CSA C22.2 No. 73. The company is also entitled to affix the CE mark to its products.

Sales 
Products are distributed worldwide through a network of independently owned franchised local "factory outlet" businesses that provide sales, service, and applications support for Haas machine tools. Introduced in 1999, with the first outlet established in Torrance, California, it was applied to the company's existing worldwide network, and then expanded to Europe.

See also 
 Windshear, Inc.

References 

Companies based in Oxnard, California
Machine tool builders
Companies established in 1983